The number of  Ramsar sites in Tunisia is 42 sites in 2022 corresponding in total to 844,685 hectares of land coverage. Tunisia started to take part in the Ramsar Convention in 1981 and has many Wetlands of significant size such as the Chott el Jerid and Ichkeul Lake, a UNESCO World Heritage Center.

References

External links 
 Official Location of all Ramsar Sites in Tunisia
 Another Map of Ramsar sites in Tunisia with short summary of specificities 

Ramsar sites in Tunisia
Tunisia
Ramsar sites